The New York State Coalition of 853 Schools was formed in 1991 to meet the growing needs of students with IEP diploma requirements. Today, the coalition meets the educational requirements of New York State on the grounds of agencies that provide various child welfare, juvenile justice, and family/community support services. These educational programs largely serve school-aged children involved in the foster care, juvenile justice and special education systems.

New York State 853 Schools
853 schools have resulted from the continued privatization of many Special Act School Districts around the state. Many are modeled after non-profit agencies and corporations to uniquely serve students with severe disabilities outside of the regular educational setting. Each operates under a unified school member Board of Directors rather than multiple BOEs per each of the Special Act school districts, thus more cost efficient to operate. Below is a partial listing of all those educational organizations with 853 status:

 Anderson Center for Autism
 Astor Home For Children
 Baker Victory Services
 Cardinal Hayes Home
 The Center for Developmental Disabilities
 Center for Spectrum Services
 Child and Family Services
 Children's Home of Kingston
 Children's Home of Poughkeepsie
 Children's Home of Wyoming Conference
 Devereux Foundation
 Gateway-Longview
 Girls and Boys Town of New York
 Green Chimneys Children's Services
 Gustavus Adolphus
 Harmony Heights
 Hawthorne Country Day School
 Hillside Children's Center
 House of the Good Shepherd
 Julia Dyckman Andrus Memorial
 Lake Grove School
 LaSalle School
 Lincoln Hall
 Lowell School
 Mary Cariola Children's Center
 Maryhaven Center of Hope
 McQuade Children's Services
 New Directions Youth & Family Services
 Norman Howard School
 Northeast Parent & Child Society
 Oak Hill School, Inc.
 Parsons Child & Family Center
 Reece School for Special Training
 SCO Family of Services
 Springbrook
 St. Anne's Institute
 St. Catherine's Center for Children
 St. Colman's Home
 Saint Dominic's Family Services
 St. Joseph's Villa of Rochester
 Summit Children's Residence Center
 Vanderheyden Hall
 Westchester School for Special Children

See also
 Lists of school districts in New York
 No Child Left Behind

References
 853 Schools NYS Court Case Ruling
 NYSED

External links
 New York State Coalition of 853 Schools
 New York State Department of Education
 NYSUT Article: Special Act, 853 schools
 VESID

Education in New York (state)